Frederick W. Marks III (born 1940) is an American historian and Catholic apologist. As a scholar, he has written and taught extensively on American diplomatic  history. As a proponent of Roman Catholicism, he has written dozens of articles and tracts and spoken extensively in public.

Education
Marks attended Loyola High School in New York City, attained his B.A. from Holy Cross College in 1962 and his Ph.D. from the University of Michigan in 1968.  He taught at the University of Michigan from 1967 to 1968, at Purdue University from 1968 to 1973 and at St. John’s University from 1974 to 1979.  At St. John's, he supervised the doctoral dissertation of graduate student Daniel W. Fitz-Simons, who had been in Navy Intelligence and the DIA before teaching at the Marine Corps Command and Staff College.

He is the author of four books and dozens of articles on history. His work is characterized by multi-archival research overseas. In addition to utilizing repositories all over the United States, his work has taken him to Germany, France, England, Scotland, Canada, Guatemala, and the Republic of China. Each of his books on American diplomatic history contains extensive endnotes and bibliographies.

In the field of Roman Catholicism, Marks has written six books and scores of full-length articles, seventeen of which have appeared in leading journals for the Catholic clergy. In addition, he has written a handbook for engaged and newly married Roman Catholic couples. It was translated into Spanish and Indonesian in 2008. He continues to be active as the author of tracts and Christian apologetics. His recent work is devoted to the Christian view of suffering and what people perceive as failure.

Publications

Books on diplomatic history
Robert W. Love, Jr., diplomatic historian at the US Naval Academy, introduced Marks in 1995 by writing: "Frederick W. Marks' wide-ranging interests have resulted in important reinterpretations of the Constitutional Convention, Theodore Roosevelt's foreign policy, and John Foster Dulles and the Cold War. His Wind Over Sand revised completely our understanding of Franklin Roosevelt's statesmanship."
 Independence on Trial: Foreign Affairs and the Making of the Constitution Baton Rouge, Louisiana State University Press, 1973, (reprinted in paperback 1986),   
 Velvet on Iron: The Diplomacy of Theodore Roosevelt Lincoln: University of Nebraska Press, 1979, (reprinted in paperback, 1982) ,  Theodore Roosevelt Specialist John Allen Gable reviewed the book in Presidential Studies Quarterly. Additionally, Edmund Morris, winner of the Pulitzer Prize for his biography of the first Roosevelt, called it "the most important book in its field since Howard K. Beale's Theodore Roosevelt and the Rise of America to World Power (1956). Indeed many readers will judge it superior to its predecessor in its elegance, brevity and courageous originality."
 Wind over Sand: The Diplomacy of Franklin Roosevelt Athens: University of Georgia Press 1988, (reprinted in paperback 1991) . Roosevelt specialist Frank Freidel of Harvard University described Wind over Sand as a "devastating revisionist critique of Franklin D. Roosevelt's foreign policy" that would challenge future scholars while Max Lerner predicted, in the Wall Street Journal, that it would "relight the fires of controversy in Rooseveltology and leave the arena of battle distinctly changed." The book was chosen as a selection by the Conservative Book Club and the Lawyer's Book Society.
 Power and Peace: The Diplomacy of John Foster Dulles Westport, Conn.: Praeger, 1993,  (reprinted in paperback 1995) .

Religious Books
 A Catholic Handbook for Engaged and Newly Married Couples (1994, reprinted in 1997 and 1999). 
 A Brief for Belief: The Case for Catholicism (1999))
 The Gift of Pain (2012)
 Think and Believe (2012)
 Confessions of a Catholic Street Evangelist (2017)
 Pro-life Champion: The Untold Story of Monsignor Philip J. Reilly and His Helpers of God's Precious Infants (2017)

Personal life
Marks has been married for over fifty years to Sylvia Marks, who holds a Ph.D. degree from Princeton University and teaches English at New York University's Polytechnic Institute.

References 

Historians of the United States
Christian apologists
American Roman Catholic religious writers
1940 births
Living people
University of Michigan alumni
University of Michigan faculty
College of the Holy Cross alumni
Purdue University faculty
St. John's University (New York City) faculty